The Men's 200m T54 had its First Round held on September 12 at 11:00 and its Final on September 14 at 9:50.

Medalists

Results

References
Round 1 - Heat 1
Round 1 - Heat 2
Round 1 - Heat 3
Final

Athletics at the 2008 Summer Paralympics